The following highways are numbered 448:

Canada
Manitoba Provincial Road 448
Highway 448 (Ontario) (unbuilt)

India
 National Highway 448 (India)

Japan
 Japan National Route 448

United States
  Louisiana Highway 448
  Maryland Route 448 (former)
  New Mexico State Road 448
  New York State Route 448
  Puerto Rico Highway 448
  Tennessee State Route 448